Max Kalman (24 December 1884 in Russia – 14 June 1963 in Texas, USA) was a Jewish architect and attorney in Boston, Massachusetts in the early 1900s, most notable for designing the Vilna Shul synagogue on Beacon Hill, Boston in 1919.

References 

1884 births
1963 deaths
20th-century American architects